Main Chand Si is a 2011 Pakistani romantic drama, that was aired on ARY Digital. The series starred Sami Khan, Saba Qamar and Fahad Mustafa, while Saba Hameed and Tipu Sharif were cast in supporting roles.

Plot
Irsa is an independent outspoken poor girl who dreams of marrying a rich boy. She marries Salar, who has a beard and is deeply religious. Irsa doesn't want any limitations placed on her by being married, hence she lies to Salar at every point. She meets her cousin Farhan at her sister's wedding and realizes that she loves him. She proceeds to lie to everyone that Salar divorced her and falsely swears on the Quran. She marries Farhan, but after several months, realises that Farhan has AIDS and lied in order to marry her. She contracts AIDS from Farhan and wants to apologize to Salar, but she learns that Salar is happily married and has moved to the USA. In the end, she commits suicide by drinking poison.

Cast 
 Saba Qamar as Irsa
 Sami Khan as Salar
 Fahad Mustafa as Farhan
 Sana Askari as Fatima
 Qaiser Naqvi as Huma
 Faiza Gillani as Abida
 Rashid Farooqui as Basit
 Sadaf Aashan as Shehrish
 Farah Nadeem as Zahida
 Isha Noor as Hira
 Gul-e-Rana as Aliya
 Sana Askari as Fatima
 Aamir Qureshi as Shehryar
 Noshaba Javed as Halima
 Naveed Raza as Fawad

See also
 List of Pakistani dramas

References

External links
 livemedia24 - Dramas

Pakistani television sitcoms
Pakistani drama television series
Urdu-language television shows
Television shows set in Karachi
ARY Digital original programming
2011 Pakistani television series debuts